Belvedere Towers  is a station of Rapid Metro Gurgaon opened in November 2013. It is owned by Haryana Mass Rapid Transport Corporation Limited and operated by Delhi Metro Rail Corporation. Earlier it was operated by Rapid Metro Gurgaon Limited.

The station was named after mobile service provider Vodafone under corporate branding of stations. The naming rights 'Vodafone' was removed in early 2019 and now it is called Belvedere Towers metro station.

Connections

Belvedere Towers metro station

External links
 
 

Rapid Metro Gurgaon stations
Railway stations in Gurgaon district
Vodafone buildings and structures